San Francisco del Yeso is a district of Luya Province, Peru. One of its best-known attractions are the ruins of Chachapoya. The region is famous for its plaster mines and crafts.

Its official holiday is on September 23, but religious festivities take place from September 23–27.  Special foods consumed during these celebrations are the Locro and Cuy.

On the north, the district borders Santo Tomás Luya; on the East, it borders Castilla Chachapoyas and Montevideo Chachapoyas; on the south it borders Leymebamba Chachapoyas; and on the west, it borders Cocabamba.

Districts of the Luya Province
Districts of the Amazonas Region